Verona Beach State Park is a  state park located on the eastern shore of Oneida Lake in the Town of Verona, Oneida County, New York.  The park is located on NY 13 northwest of the City of Oneida and south of Sylvan Beach. Oneida Creek enters the Oneida Lake south of the park.

History
Prior to being purchased by New York State in the 1940s, much of the area that would become the park was a privately owned tract known as Nabor's Grove. Many large trees were preserved under private ownership, contributing to the mature forest that is found on much of the park's property today.

In 1944, the New York State Council of Parks approved the initial acquisition of land for Verona Beach State Park. By 1962, 59 lots comprising  had been purchased at a cost of $276,300.

The park is operated by the New York State Office of Parks, Recreation and Historic Preservation (Central Region).

Facilities

The park, set on  along the eastern shore of Oneida Lake and featuring a diverse wetland habitat, offers facilities for a variety of outdoor activities.

Hunting for deer, small game, and waterfowl is also permitted, as is fishing and ice fishing.

In 2013, $4.3 million in improvements were announced for Verona Beach State Park, including a new bathhouse, a new food concession, an enclosed picnic pavilion, three picnic shelters to replace the park's temporary rental tents, and a reconstructed parking area.

The park has about 35 seasonal employees. It is open for daily use through Labor Day, after which the beach is closed, although the campgrounds are open through Columbus Day in October and hiking trails remain open year-round. Daily use fee is $7 per car. The beach is open from 11 a.m. to 7 p.m. daily during the summer months.

See also
 List of New York state parks

References

External links

 New York State Parks: Verona Beach State Park
 Verona Beach State Park map

State parks of New York (state)
Parks in Oneida County, New York